WRPQ (740 AM) is a radio station broadcasting an adult hits / variety hits format. Licensed to Baraboo, Wisconsin, United States, the station serves the Wisconsin Dells area.  The station is currently owned by Baraboo Broadcasting Corporation. Original call letters were WBOO. It simulcasts on FM translator W259BC 99.7 FM Baraboo.

On September 18, 2017, WRPQ changed their format from adult contemporary to adult hits / variety hits, branded as "99.7 Max FM". The station focuses on music from the 80s and 90s, but also plays some 2000s and current songs.

References

External links

RPQ
Adult hits radio stations in the United States
1967 establishments in Wisconsin
Radio stations established in 1967